The 2010 MPS Group Championships was a women's tennis tournament played on outdoor clay courts. It was the 31st edition of the MPS Group Championships and the second held in its new location, and was part of the International series of the 2010 WTA Tour. It took place at the Sawgrass Country Club in Ponte Vedra Beach, Florida, United States from April 5 through April 11, 2010.

The tournament was headlined by world no. 2 Caroline Wozniacki, 2010 Moorilla Hobart International champion Alyona Bondarenko, 2008 finalist Dominika Cibulková, and 2010 Monterrey Open champion Anastasia Pavlyuchenkova.

Entrants

Seeds

Rankings and seedings are as of March 22.

Other entrants
The following players received wildcards into the main draw:
 Carly Gullickson
 Ayumi Morita
 Sloane Stephens

The following players received entry via qualifying:
 Sophie Ferguson
 Sesil Karatantcheva
 Bethanie Mattek-Sands
 Anna Tatishvili

Finals

Singles

 Caroline Wozniacki defeated  Olga Govortsova, 6–2, 7–5
It was Wozniacki's first title of the year and 7th of her career. It was her second win at the event, also winning in 2009.

Doubles

 Bethanie Mattek-Sands /  Yan Zi defeated  Chuang Chia-jung /  Peng Shuai, 4–6, 6–4, [10–8]

External links
 ITF tournament edition details

MPS Group Championships
Amelia Island Championships
MPS Group Championships
MPS Group Championships
MPS Group Championships